Ben Lane (born 13 July 1997) is an English badminton player. He won the men's doubles silver medal at the 2022 Commonwealth Games and a bronze medal in the European Championships.

Personal life 
Ben's mother Suzanne Louis-Lane, represented England in badminton and had won the women's singles title at the National Championships in 1993 and 1994. His older brother, Alex, represented England in badminton and won the men's singles at the 2017 National Championships.

Lane was educated at Exmouth Community College.

Career 
Lane started playing badminton at aged nine, and in his junior career, he had won the U-17 European Championships in the boys' and mixed doubles event in 2014. He also won two silvers and a bronze medal at the 2015 European Junior Championships. Lane was part of the English team that won the mixed team bronze at the 2018 Commonwealth Games in Gold Coast.

In 2021, Lane claimed his first World Tour title at the Orléans Masters, after in the final they beat Indian pair Krishna Prasad Garaga and Vishnu Vardhan Goud Panjala. Lane competed at the 2020 Summer Olympics, but was eliminated in the group stage.

In 2022, Lane won the men's doubles bronze medal at the Madrid European Championships with Sean Vendy, after  they were defeated by German pair Mark Lamsfuß and Marvin Seidel in the semi-finals. In August, Lane made his second appearance in the Commonwealth Games, and won a silver medal with Vendy in the men's doubles.

Achievements

Commonwealth Games 
Men's doubles

European Championships 
Men's doubles

European Junior Championships 
Boys' doubles

Mixed doubles

BWF World Tour (1 title) 
The BWF World Tour, which was announced on 19 March 2017 and implemented in 2018, is a series of elite badminton tournaments sanctioned by the Badminton World Federation (BWF). The BWF World Tour is divided into levels of World Tour Finals, Super 1000, Super 750, Super 500, Super 300 (part of the HSBC World Tour), and the BWF Tour Super 100.

Men's doubles

BWF International Challenge/Series (10 titles, 5 runners-up) 
Men's doubles

Mixed doubles

  BWF International Challenge tournament
  BWF International Series tournament
  BWF Future Series tournament

References

External links 
 
 

1997 births
Living people
People from Kingston upon Thames
Sportspeople from Surrey
English male badminton players
Badminton players at the 2020 Summer Olympics
Olympic badminton players of Great Britain
Badminton players at the 2018 Commonwealth Games
Badminton players at the 2022 Commonwealth Games
Commonwealth Games silver medallists for England
Commonwealth Games bronze medallists for England
Commonwealth Games medallists in badminton
Medallists at the 2018 Commonwealth Games
Medallists at the 2022 Commonwealth Games